Carlos Madrazo Limón (born 2 February 1952) is a Mexican politician affiliated with the National Action Party. He served as Senator of the LVIII and LIX Legislatures of the Mexican Congress representing the State of Mexico, and previously served as municipal president of Atizapán de Zaragoza from 1997 to 2000.

References

1952 births
Living people
Politicians from Mexico City
Members of the Senate of the Republic (Mexico)
National Action Party (Mexico) politicians
20th-century Mexican politicians
21st-century Mexican politicians
Universidad Iberoamericana alumni
Alumni of the University of London
Academic staff of Universidad Autónoma Metropolitana
Municipal presidents in the State of Mexico